Ethnic Cleansing is a far-right first-person shooter video game for the Microsoft Windows operating system, created by the American white supremacist and hate organization National Alliance  (and published by its record label Resistance Records) on January 21, 2002. As part of a "race war", the player controls a neo-Nazi skinhead or a Klansman and is tasked with killing stereotypical African-American, Latino, and Jewish enemies, ending with then-Israeli Prime Minister Ariel Sharon.

Using the Genesis3D engine, the National Alliance created the game to be provocative and to support their white supremacist message. The game has been controversial, with the Anti-Defamation League taking particular issue; it has been ranked several times as one of the most controversial games ever created. It was planned to be followed by a long line of sequels, but only one, titled White Law, was ever released.

Gameplay
Ethnic Cleansing is a short first-person shooter set in a single level. As a neo-Nazi skinhead or a Klansman, the player runs through a ghetto that has been compared to New York City and shoot African-Americans and Mexicans, before descending into a subway system to kill Jews. Finally, the player reaches the "Yiddish Control Center", where a fictionalized version of Ariel Sharon, then Prime Minister of Israel, is directing plans for world domination. He carries a rocket launcher, and the player must kill him to complete the game. The head-up display contains a map of nearby enemies and a counter of remaining ammunition.

The game's soundtrack consists of white power rock music. The game's art assets and sound effects feature racial stereotypes: when shot, black enemies make monkey noises and Jews are dressed as Haredim rabbis and shout "oy vey". Mexicans shout "I need to take a siesta now". In addition, black enemies are drawn to resemble apes, and some wear T-shirts with the lettering "NIGZ", while Mexicans wear sombreros.

Development and release

Ethnic Cleansing was developed by members of the National Alliance, an American white supremacist organization, and published by Resistance Records, its subsidiary record label that specializes in white power music. It was developed for Microsoft Windows personal computers using Eclipse Entertainment's open-source game engine Genesis3D along with the Reality Factory development kit. The source code was not substantially changed from the original. Instead, the developers simply plugged in images and sounds that they had created in freely available editing programs.

Shaun Walker, the chairman of the National Alliance, explained to the United Press that the intent was to produce a racially provocative video game and promote racial segregation. National Alliance founder William Luther Pierce, who also appears in the game to discuss an "upcoming white revolution", considered video games to be simply another medium to promote his organization's messages. Resistance released the game on Martin Luther King, Jr. Day (January 21) of 2002. It was priced at USD $14.88, a reference to the white supremacist Fourteen Words slogan and the neo-Nazi numerical code "88" (which stands for "HH" or "Heil Hitler").

Reception

The game's reception from critics was extremely negative. In January 2003, Stuff named Ethnic Cleansing the 40th most controversial video game of all time. The staff opined that only "very stupid children" would be susceptible to its message and that it would make players feel like "small-minded assholes". Complex and UGO ranked it as the single most racist video game in history. UGO staff writer K. Thor Jensen called it "profoundly stupid".

The game is currently prohibited from being broadcast on live-streaming service Twitch.

Sequel
The National Alliance and Resistance Records released a similar game, White Law, in June 2003. It starred an Irish-American police officer taking up arms to protect his territory from racial minorities. The game was based on the events of the pseudonymous novel The Turner Diaries. The National Alliance expressed an intention to create an entire line of racist games, but no further games have been produced.

References

External links
 ADL article
 Archive of developer

2002 video games
Advergames
Antisemitic publications
Ethnic cleansing
First-person shooters
Indie video games
Neo-Nazi propaganda
Neo-Nazism in fiction
Obscenity controversies in video games
Propaganda video games
Neo-Nazism in the United States
Race-related controversies in video games
Video games developed in the United States
Windows games
Windows-only games
Video games set in the United States
Single-player video games